Thomas Alfred Patrick (December 23, 1864September 8, 1943) was a Canadian politician and physician. He served on the North-West Legislative Assembly for Yorkton from 1897 to 1904.

Early life 
Thomas Alfred Patrick was born on December 23, 1864 in Ilderton, Ontario to George Blackall Patrick (1832–1917) and Alicia Hobbs, the oldest of 12 children. He graduated medicine from the University of Western Ontario in 1888 and was a surgery in Saltcoats until 1894, then moved to Yorkton where he practiced until 1939.

Political life 
Patrick first contested the 1891 North-West Territories general election in the Wallace electoral district, finishing second to Joel Reaman. Patrick again ran for office in the in an October 1897 by-election for the Yorkton electoral district and was acclaimed, and in the subsequent 1898 North-West Territories general election, was acclaimed again. In the 1902 North-West Territories general election Patrick defeated J.E. Peake with 408 votes to Peake's 141.

Patrick stepped down from the Assembly in 1904 to run in the 1904 Canadian federal election and bring forward the issue of provincial status for the North-West Territories. Shortly after accepting the Conservative nomination, Laurier announced that the Dominion government would provide province status to the North-West Territories. Patrick stated that he would not have ran if he knew the announcement would occur. Patrick finished a distant second in the Mackenzie electoral district to Liberal Edward L. Cash, who was also a doctor in Yorkton.

In the Assembly, Patrick was a supporter of the Frederick W. A. G. Haultain government and responsible government for the North-West Territories until 1902 when he disagreed with Haultain's goal of a single large province. Instead, Patrick envisioned a province divided similar to borders which were adopted for Alberta and Saskatchewan.

Later life 
Patrick delivered the first child born in the province of Saskatchewan after entering Confederation a few seconds after midnight on September 1, 1905. Patrick died on September 8, 1943.

Patrick's memoirs were published in 1980 under the title Pioneer of vision : the reminiscences of T.A. Patrick, M.D., with the foreword written by former Prime Minister John G. Diefenbaker. Diefenbaker described Patrick as "one of the greats of the pioneer days in Saskatchewan" and that his "vision and determination" shaped the province of Saskatchewan to the present.

References 

Works cited
 

1864 births
1943 deaths
Members of the Legislative Assembly of the Northwest Territories
Physicians from Saskatchewan
University of Western Ontario alumni